Nalband (also Romanized as Na‘lband) is a village in Bastam Rural District, in the Central District of Chaypareh County, West Azerbaijan Province, Iran. At the 2006 census, its population was 194, in 54 families.

References 

Populated places in Chaypareh County